This is a list of public art in Vigo County, Indiana.

This list applies only to works of public art accessible in an outdoor public space. For example, this does not include artwork visible inside a museum.

Most of the works mentioned are sculptures. When this is not the case (i.e. sound installation, for example) it is stated next to the title.

Saint Mary-of-the-Woods

Terre Haute

West Terre Haute

Notes

Tourist attractions in Vigo County, Indiana
Vigo County